The 2009–10 Coupe de la Ligue was the 16th edition of France's league cup, organized by the LFP. The defending champions were Ligue 1 club Bordeaux who defeated second division club Vannes 4–0 in the 2009 final. The competition began on 25 July 2009 and the final was held on 27 March 2010 at the Stade de France. The winners of the Coupe de la Ligue will qualify for the third qualifying round of the UEFA Europa League 2010–11. Ligue 1 club Marseille won the competition by defeating fellow first division club Bordeaux by a score of 3–1 in the final, thus giving them their first trophy since 1992.

News
On 29 June 2009, the Ligue de Football Professionnel board of directors announced that France Télévisions will be the official provider of Coupe de la Ligue coverage for the next three seasons.

For the 2009–10 Coupe de la Ligue season, six clubs will be exempted until the Round of 16, the top 5 Ligue 1 finishers from the 2008–09 season and the winner of the 2008–09 Coupe de France. These teams earned exemption by virtue of qualifying for European competitions this season. Previously, only two clubs were exempted, the Ligue 1 champions and the runners-up. The six clubs that are exempted this year are Bordeaux, Marseille, Lyon, Toulouse, Lille, and Guingamp.

The draw for the preliminary round, 1st round, and 2nd round was determined on 8 July.

Calendar

Preliminary round
The preliminary round was played on 25 July and featured the 2nd and 3rd-place finishers from the 2008–09 Championnat National season, the bottom three finishers from the 2008–09 Ligue 2 season, and FC Gueugnon, all of whom qualified by virtue of their professional status in the LFP .

Source: LFP

First round
The 1st round was played on 1 August and featured the three winners from the preliminary round, the bottom three finishers from the 2009 Ligue 1 season, the top finisher from the 2009 Championnat National season and thirteen mid-table teams from Ligue 2.

Source: LFP

Second round
The 2nd round was played on the 25, 26, and 27 August and featured the ten clubs that successfully advanced from the 1st round.

Source: LFP

Third round
The 3rd round was played on 22 and 23 September and featured the five clubs that successfully advanced from the 2nd round, the twelve non-exempt Ligue 1 clubs, plus the top three finishers from Ligue 2.

Source: LFP

Round of 16
The Round of 16 was played on 12 January 2010. It featured the five exempt Ligue 1 teams, the ten winners from the 3rd round, and the winner of the 2008–09 Coupe de France. The draw was determined on 25 September. The Le Mans–Bordeaux match was rescheduled to 26 January due to inclement weather.

Source: LFP

Quarter-finals

Semi-finals

Final

Topscorer
Brandão (4 goals)

See also
 2009–10 Ligue 1
 2009–10 Ligue 2
 2009–10 Championnat National
 2009–10 Coupe de France

References

External links
 Coupe de la Ligue official websites:
 English
 French

Coupe de la Ligue seasons
France
League Cup